100 King Street West, formerly known as Stelco Tower, is the third tallest building in Hamilton, Ontario, Canada. The , 25-storey office skyscraper was completed in 1972, and is part of the larger Lloyd D. Jackson Square complex.

History
The tower was built as the head office of Stelco, Canada's largest steel producer and one of Hamilton's largest employers. The company used the tower to demonstrate the versatility of steel and to showcase its newest development, "Stelcoloy"; a specialised steel alloy designed to slowly rust over time. The rust helps protect the steel from further damage. This process of oxidation accounts for the steel's unique self-colouring nature; the steel was grey-blue when the building was first erected.

Description
The building's facade consists of alternating horizontal rows of Stelcoloy steel, and glass windows. The interior features a large lobby with granite floors, a security desk, a digital directory, and 2 steel-clad elevator banks. The low-rise elevator bank, located on the east side of the lobby, features 4 modernized Otis elevators that serve floors 2 through 14, with one of the elevators serving the underground parking lot. The high-rise elevator bank, located on the West side of the lobby, features 5 modernized Otis elevators that serve floors 15 through 24, with one of the elevators serving the underground parking lot, as well as mechanical floors 1 and 25. There is a single Otis elevator between the 2 elevator banks that serves the plaza level and the underground parking lot. The lobby also features escalators and stairs that lead to the plaza level. The building features column-free floor plates, and is a rare example of a modern skyscraper that features a mail chute. The Jackson Square mall, as well as the 3 other office buildings in the complex are accessible from the lobby level. The building features a large common underground parking lot with a capacity of 1300 vehicles.

Images

See also
Lloyd D. Jackson Square
1 James Street North
Robert Thomson Building
120 King Street West
List of tallest buildings in Hamilton, Ontario

References

External links
Hamilton Skyscraper page- diagrams
Image: Stelco Tower
Buildings and structures in Hamilton, Ontario
International style architecture in Canada
Modernist architecture in Canada
Headquarters in Canada
Office buildings completed in 1972